Chiari malformation (CM) is a structural defect in the cerebellum, characterized by a downward displacement of one or both cerebellar tonsils through the foramen magnum (the opening at the base of the skull). CMs can cause headaches, difficulty swallowing, vomiting, dizziness, neck pain, unsteady gait, poor hand coordination, numbness and tingling of the hands and feet, and speech problems. Less often, people may experience ringing or buzzing in the ears, weakness, slow heart rhythm, or fast heart rhythm, curvature of the spine (scoliosis) related to spinal cord impairment, abnormal breathing, such as central sleep apnea, characterized by periods of breathing cessation during sleep, and, in severe cases, paralysis.

This can sometimes lead to non-communicating hydrocephalus as a result of obstruction of cerebrospinal fluid (CSF) outflow. The cerebrospinal fluid outflow is caused by phase difference in outflow and influx of blood in the vasculature of the brain. The malformation is named after the Austrian pathologist Hans Chiari. A type II CM is also known as an Arnold–Chiari malformation in honor of Chiari and German pathologist Julius Arnold.

Signs and symptoms
Findings are due to brain stem and lower cranial nerve dysfunction. Onset of symptoms are less likely to be present during adulthood in most patients. Younger children generally have a substantially different presentation of clinical symptoms from older children. Younger children are more likely to have a more rapid neurological degeneration with profound brain stem dysfunction over several days.
 Neurogenic dysphagia: Difficulty swallowing. Seen by poor feeding in patient.
 Cyanosis: Bluish discoloration of skin while feeding.
 Weak crying
 Facial weakness
 Aspiration
 Headaches aggravated by Valsalva maneuvers, such as yawning, laughing, crying, coughing, sneezing or straining, bending over, or getting up suddenly
 Tinnitus (ringing in the ears)
 Lhermitte's sign (electrical sensation that runs down the back and into the limbs)
 Vertigo (dizziness)
 Nausea
 Schmahmann syndrome
 Nystagmus (irregular eye movements; typically, so-called "downbeat nystagmus")
 Facial pain
 Muscle weakness
 Impaired gag reflex
 Dysphagia (difficulty swallowing)
 Restless leg syndrome
 Sleep apnea
 Sleep disorders
 Impaired coordination
 Severe cases may develop all the symptoms and signs of a bulbar palsy
 Paralysis due to pressure at the cervico-medullary junction may progress in a so-called "clockwise" fashion, affecting the right arm, then the right leg, then the left leg, and finally the left arm; or the opposite way around.
 Papilledema on fundoscopic exam due to Increased intracranial pressure
 Pupillary dilation
 Dysautonomia: tachycardia (rapid heart), syncope (fainting), polydipsia (extreme thirst), chronic fatigue
 Apnea: Sudden pause of breathing, usually during sleep.
 Opisthotonos: Spasm of the head which causes head to arch backwards. More common in infants than adults.
 Stridor

The blockage of cerebrospinal fluid (CSF) flow may also cause a syrinx to form, eventually leading to syringomyelia. Central cord symptoms such as hand weakness, dissociated sensory loss, and, in severe cases, paralysis may occur.

Syringomyelia

Syringomyelia is most often chronic progressive degenerative disorder characterized by a fluid-filled cyst located in the spinal cord. However, there can be also cases where the syrinx in terms of size and extent of symptoms actually stays stable throughout a lifetime. Syringomyelia symptoms include pain, weakness, numbness, and stiffness in the back, shoulders, arms or legs. Other symptoms include headaches, the inability to feel changes in the temperature, sweating, sexual dysfunction, and loss of bowel and bladder control. It is usually seen in the cervical region but can extend into the medulla oblongata and pons or it can reach downward into the thoracic or lumbar segments. Syringomyelia is often associated with type I Chiari malformation and is commonly seen between the C-4 and C-6 levels. The exact development of syringomyelia is unknown but many theories suggest that the herniated tonsils in type I Chiari malformations cause a "plug" to form, which does not allow an outlet of CSF from the brain to the spinal canal. Syringomyelia is present in 25% of patients with type I Chiari malformations.

Pathophysiology

The most widely accepted pathophysiological mechanism by which Chiari type I malformations occur is by a reduction or lack of development of the posterior fossa as a result of congenital or acquired disorders. Congenital causes include hydrocephalus, craniosynostosis (especially of the lambdoid suture), hyperostosis (such as craniometaphyseal dysplasia, osteopetrosis, erythroid hyperplasia), X-linked vitamin D-resistant rickets, and neurofibromatosis type I. Acquired disorders include space occupying lesions due to one of several potential causes ranging from brain tumors to hematomas.
Traumatic brain injury may cause delayed acquired Chiari malformation, but the pathophysiology of this is unknown. Additionally, ectopia may be present but asymptomatic until a whiplash injury causes it to become symptomatic.

Some neurological experts believe that Chiari malformation type I is developed as a result of Filum Disease, an abnormal traction of the spinal cord caused by an excessively tense Filum terminale. This theory was first introduced by Dr. Miguel B. Royo Salvador in 1993.

Diagnosis
Diagnosis is made through a combination of patient history, neurological examination, and medical imaging. Magnetic resonance imaging (MRI) is considered the preferred imaging modality for Chiari malformation. The MRI visualizes neural tissue such as the cerebellar tonsils and spinal cord as well as bone and other soft tissues. CT and CT myelography are other options and were used prior to the advent of MRI, unfortunately the resolution of CT based modalities do not characterize syringomyelia and other neural abnormalities as well.

By convention, the cerebellar tonsil position is measured relative to the basion-opisthion line, using sagittal T1 MRI images or sagittal CT images. The selected cutoff distance for abnormal tonsil position is somewhat arbitrary, as not every person will be symptomatic at a certain amount of tonsil displacement, and the probability of symptoms and syrinx increases with greater displacement; however, greater than 5 mm is the most frequently cited cutoff number, though some consider 3–5 mm to be "borderline,"; pathological signs and syrinx may occur beyond that distance. One study showed little difference in cerebellar tonsil position between standard recumbent MRI and upright MRI for patients without a history of whiplash injury. Neuroradiological investigation is used to first rule out any intracranial condition that could be responsible for tonsillar herniation. Neuroradiological diagnostics evaluate the severity of crowding of the neural structures within the posterior cranial fossa and their pressure against the foramen magnum. Chiari 1.5 is a term used when both brainstem and tonsillar herniation through the foramen magnum are present.

The diagnosis of a Chiari II malformation can be made prenatally, through ultrasound.

Classification
In the late 19th century, Austrian pathologist Hans Chiari described seemingly related anomalies of the hindbrain, the so-called Chiari malformations I, II and III. Later, other investigators added a fourth (Chiari IV) malformation. The scale of severity is rated I – IV, with IV being the most severe. Types III and IV are very rare. Since Dr. Chiari's original descriptions Chiari 0, 1.5, 3.5, and 5 have been described in the medical literature.

Types of Chiari malformation

Other conditions sometimes causally associated with Chiari malformation include hydrocephalus, syringomyelia, spinal curvature, tethered spinal cord syndrome, and connective tissue disorders such as Ehlers-Danlos syndrome and Marfan syndrome.

Chiari malformation is the most frequently used term for this set of conditions.  The use of the term "Arnold–Chiari malformation" has fallen somewhat out of favor over time, although it is used to refer to the type II malformation.  Current sources use "Chiari malformation" to describe its four specific types, reserving the term "Arnold-Chiari" for type II only. Some sources still use "Arnold-Chiari" for all four types.

Chiari malformation or Arnold–Chiari malformation should not be confused with Budd-Chiari syndrome, a hepatic condition also named for Hans Chiari.

In Pseudo-Chiari Malformation, leaking of CSF may cause displacement of the cerebellar tonsils and similar symptoms sufficient to be mistaken for a Chiari I malformation.

Treatment
While there is no current cure, the treatments for Chiari malformation are surgery and management of symptoms, based on the occurrence of clinical symptoms rather than the radiological findings. The presence of a syrinx is known to give specific signs and symptoms that vary from dysesthetic sensations to algo-thermal dissociation to spasticity and paresis. These are important indications that decompressive surgery is needed for patients with Chiari Malformation Type II. Type II patients have severe brain stem damage and rapidly diminishing neurological response.

Decompressive surgery involves removing the lamina of the first and sometimes the second or third cervical vertebrae and part of the occipital bone of the skull to relieve pressure. The flow of spinal fluid may be augmented by a shunt. Since this surgery usually involves the opening of the dura mater and the expansion of the space beneath, a dural graft is usually applied to cover the expanded posterior fossa.

A small number of neurological surgeons believe that detethering the spinal cord as an alternate approach relieves the compression of the brain against the skull opening (foramen magnum), obviating the need for decompression surgery and associated trauma. However, this approach is significantly less documented in the medical literature, with reports on only a handful of patients. The alternative spinal surgery is also not without risk.

Complications of decompression surgery can arise. They include bleeding, damage to structures in the brain and spinal canal, meningitis, CSF fistulas, occipito-cervical instability and pseudomeningocele. Rare post-operative complications include hydrocephalus and brain stem compression by retroflexion of odontoid. Also, an extended CVD created by a wide opening and big duroplasty can cause a cerebellar "slump". This complication needs to be corrected by cranioplasty.

In certain cases, irreducible compression of the brainstem occurs from in front (anteriorly or ventral) resulting in a smaller posterior fossa and associated Chiari malformation. In these cases, an anterior decompression is required. The most commonly used approach is to operate through the mouth (transoral) to remove the bone compressing the brainstem, typically the odontoid. This results in decompressing the brainstem and therefore gives more room for the cerebellum, thus decompressing the Chiari malformation. Arnold Menzes, MD, is the neurosurgeon who pioneered this approach in the 1970s at the University of Iowa. Between 1984 and 2008 (the MR imaging era), 298 patients with irreducible ventral compression of the brainstem and Chiari type 1 malformation underwent a transoral approach for ventral cervicomedullary decompression at the University of Iowa. The results have been excellent resulting in improved brainstem function and resolution of the Chiari malformation in the majority of patients.

Epidemiology
Congenital Chiari I malformation, defined as tonsilar herniations of 3 to 5 mm or greater, was previously believed to be in the range of one per 1000 births, but is likely much higher. Women are three times more likely than men to have a congenital Chiari malformation. Type II malformations are more prevalent in people of Celtic descent. A study using upright MRI found cerebellar tonsillar ectopia in 23% of adults with headache from motor-vehicle-accident head trauma. Upright MRI was more than twice as sensitive as standard MRI, likely because gravity affects cerebellar position.

Cases of congenital Chiari malformation may be explained by evolutionary and genetic factors. Typically, an infant's brain weighs around 400g at birth and triples to 1100-1400g by age 11. At the same time the cranium triples in volume from 500 cm3 to 1500 cm3 to accommodate the growing brain. During human evolution, the skull underwent numerous changes to accommodate the growing brain. The evolutionary changes included increased size and shape of the skull, decreased basal angle and basicranial length. These modifications resulted in significant reduction of the size of the posterior fossa in modern humans. In normal adults, the posterior fossa comprises 27% of the total intracranial space, while in adults with Chiari Type I, it is only 21%. H. neanderthalensis had platycephalic (flattened) skulls. Some cases of Chiari are associated with platybasia (flattening of the skull base).

History
The history of Chiari malformation is described below and categorized by the year:
 1883: Cleland was the first to describe Chiari II or Arnold–Chiari malformation on his report of a child with spina bifida, hydrocephalus, and anatomical alterations of the cerebellum and brainstem.
 1891: Hans Chiari, a Viennese pathologist, described the case of a 17-year-old female with elongation of the tonsils into cone shaped projections which accompany the medulla and are crammed into the spinal canal.
 1907: Schwalbe and Gredig, pupils of German pathologist Julius Arnold, described four cases of meningomyelocele and alterations in the brainstem and cerebellum, and gave the name "Arnold-Chiari" to these malformations.
 1932: Van Houweninge Graftdijk was the first to report the surgical treatment of Chiari malformations. All patients died from surgery or postoperative complications.
 1935: Russell and Donald suggested that decompression of the spinal cord at the foramen magnum might facilitate the CSF circulation.
 1940: Gustafson and Oldberg diagnosed Chiari malformation with syringomyelia.
 1974: Bloch et al. described the tonsils position to be classified between 7 mm and 8 mm below cerebellum.
 1985: Aboulezz used MRI for discovery of extension

Society and culture
The condition was brought to the mainstream on the series CSI: Crime Scene Investigation in the tenth-season episode "Internal Combustion" on February 4, 2010.
Chiari malformation was briefly mentioned on the medical drama House M.D. in the fifth-season episode "House Divided",  It was the focus of the sixth-season episode "The Choice." It is also the focus of Private Practice Season 4 episode 4, where a pregnant woman is diagnosed with it. It was the a cause of death on the reality television series Dr. G: Medical Examiner in the sixth-season episode "Bruised and Battered". It was also mentioned in the medical drama A Gifted Man, in the first-season episode "In Case of Separation Anxiety".
It is also featured in the 3rd and 4th episode of the 7th season of the series Rizzoli & Isles where Dr. Maura Isles is diagnosed with the condition.

Notable people
 Rosanne Cash – U.S. singer-songwriter; daughter of Johnny Cash
 Julia Clukey – U.S. luge competitor for Team USA in 2010 Vancouver Winter Olympics
 Joanna David – British television and stage actress
 J. B. Holmes – U.S. professional golfer
 Marissa Irwin – U.S. fashion model with Chiari secondary to Ehlers-Danlos syndrome
 Bobby Jones – U.S. World Golf Hall of Fame golfer and founder of the Augusta National Golf Club
 Allysa Seely – U.S. Gold Medalist at the 2016 Summer Paralympics in the paratriathlon
 Leah Shapiro – U.S. drummer for the band Black Rebel Motorcycle Club
 Michelle Stilwell – Canadian wheelchair racer and politician
 Rachid Taha – Algerian singer
 Sabre Norris – Australian skateboarder and surfer

See also

 Hypermobility spectrum disorder

References 

Congenital disorders of nervous system
Diseases named for discoverer